Johannes Marott (14 June 1917 – 21 November 1985) was a Danish film actor. He appeared in 19 films between 1949 and 1981.

He was born in Frederiksberg, Denmark and died in Denmark.

Filmography

 Kniven i hjertet (1981)
 Alt på et bræt (1977)
 Venus fra Vestø (1962)
 Ballade på Bullerborg (1959)
 Pigen og vandpytten (1958)
 Soldaterkammerater (1958)
 Ung kærlighed (1958)
 Verdens rigeste pige (1958)
 Krudt og klunker (1958)
 Mariannes bryllup (1958)
 Englen i sort (1957)
 Ingen tid til kærtegn (1957)
 Vi som går stjernevejen (1956)
 Den store gavtyv (1956)
 Vejrhanen (1952)
 Susanne (1950)
 Det hændte i København (1949)
 Kampen mod uretten (1949)
 Thorkild Roose (1949)

References

External links

1917 births
1985 deaths
Danish male film actors
People from Frederiksberg
20th-century Danish male actors